The geology of Dominica is part of the broader Lesser Antilles volcanic island arc, considered a modern example of island arcs that often accreted to continents as exotic terranes. Dominica is located in the center of the chain, with Guadeloupe to the north and Martinique to the south. Pleistocene sediments overlie almost the entire island except for an area of Pliocene exposures in the east. The oldest basement rocks are volcanic basalt deposits from the Eocene.

References

 
Dominica